Bonate may refer to places in Italy:
Bonate Sopra, a municipality in the province of Bergamo
Bonate Sotto, a municipality in the province of Bergamo